The Roman Catholic diocese of Tiraspol (Dioecesis Tiraspolitanus) was established in 1848, as a suffragan see of the Archdiocese of Mogilev. The Catholic population for which it catered was largely German in ethnic origin, although there were also significant Polish and Armenian Catholic communities. The see city of the diocese was Saratov rather than Tiraspol; the choice of Tiraspol for the name of the diocese may have been because the city had been the cathedral city of the fourteenth century diocese of Kherson. The first Roman Catholic bishop of Tiraspol, appointed in 1850, was Ferdinand Helanus Kahn, OP, a German Dominican. Wincenty Lipski, a Pole, was appointed auxiliary bishop in 1856.

The diocese's churches included the Italian Church of the Assumption in Mariupol, founded in 1853.

After Bishop Kahn's death in 1864, successive bishops were Franz Xaver Zottmann, 1872–1888; Anton Zerr, 1889–1902; Eduard von der Ropp, 1902–1903; Joseph Kessler, from 1904. Under Soviet rule, the diocese, as with the structures of many other churches and religious communities, was the subject of repression. Bishop Kessler went into exile in 1918, and the see of Tiraspol became formally vacant on his death in 1933. Meanwhile, there were attempts to organise the diocese under a series of apostolic administrators, viz.: Johannes Roth, Alexander Frison, and Augustin Baumtrog, but these attempts ended in increased repression, and in two cases, their execution (Frison in 1937, Roth in 1938).

The diocese remained inactive, but formally in existence, until its formal suppression in 2002, when the new diocese of St Clement in Saratov was erected, incorporating territory within Russia belonging to the former diocese of Tiraspol. Territory of the former diocese now situated in Moldova and Transnistria was assigned to the Apostolic Administration of Moldova, erected in 1993. Territory of the former diocese in southern Ukraine is now part of the Diocese of Odessa-Simferopol.

References

External links 
 GCatholic.org

Former Roman Catholic dioceses in Europe
Roman Catholic dioceses and prelatures established in the 19th century
1848 establishments in the Russian Empire